Smiley Run is a  long 2nd order tributary to the Youghiogheny River in Fayette County, Pennsylvania.

Course
Smiley Run rises about 1 mile south of Chaintown, Pennsylvania, and then flows south to join the Youghiogheny River at Dawson.

Watershed
Smiley Run drains  of area, receives about 42.1 in/year of precipitation, has a wetness index of 344.85, and is about 44% forested.

References

 
Tributaries of the Ohio River
Rivers of Pennsylvania
Rivers of Fayette County, Pennsylvania
Allegheny Plateau